"Living on My Own" is a song by British singer Freddie Mercury, originally included on his first solo album, Mr. Bad Guy (1985). It was released as a single (backed with "My Love Is Dangerous") in September 1985 in the United Kingdom, where it peaked at number 50. The July 1985 release in the United States had "She Blows Hot and Cold" as its B-side. Eight years later, in 1993, "Living on My Own" was remixed and re-released to widespread chart success. The song's lyrics reflect Mercury's longstanding admiration for Greta Garbo, whose quotations are featured prominently in the lyrics.

1993 No More Brothers' Mix version
On 19 July 1993, almost two years after Mercury's death, the No More Brothers Mix of "Living on My Own" was released. This remix reached number one in the UK, Ireland, and France (for 15 weeks), becoming Mercury's first solo number-one hit. Meanwhile, in the United States, the 1993 version was not officially released. It remained at the top for two weeks on the British charts.

Critical reception
Tom Ewing of Freaky Trigger felt that Mercury "sounds terrific over house music". Pan-European magazine Music & Media wrote that the Belgian dance producers "picked up a Mercury vocal track, put it on top of sequencers—with surprising results—and made a local top 10 hit out of it". John Kilgo from The Network Forty said that "hitting you over the head like a hammer, the harmony-laden hook compliments (sic) an uptempo groove". A reviewer from Sandwell Evening Mail declared it as "a stunning Euro-style remix".

Chart performance
The 1993 No More Brothers Mix of "Living on My Own" was very successful in Europe. It made it to number one in Denmark, France, Greece, Iceland, Ireland, Italy, the Netherlands, Norway, Spain, Sweden and the United Kingdom, as well as on the Eurochart Hot 100. In the UK, it hit the top spot in its third week on the UK Singles Chart, on 8 August 1993; the single spent two weeks at the top of the chart. Additionally, it reached number two in Austria, Belgium, Germany, and Switzerland. In these countries, it was held off reaching number one by 4 Non Blondes' "What's Up". "Living on My Own" earned a gold record in the Netherlands, Sweden, and the UK, while it earned a platinum record in Austria and Germany.

Music video
The accompanying videos for both the original 1985 and the 1993 remix versions of "Living on My Own" show footage of Mercury's 39th birthday celebration on 5th September 1985 at the travesty nightclub Old Mrs. Henderson in Munich, where Mercury lived from 1979 to 1985. The theme of the birthday party was "A Black and White Drag Ball". Because of the garishly costumed homosexuals and transvestites celebrating a decadent raucous party in the video clip, the British broadcaster BBC long refused to broadcast the music video on its channels. The video was directed by Hannes Rossacher and Rudi Dolezal, and received heavy rotation on MTV Europe. It was later published on Mercury's official YouTube channel in November 2012, and as of January 2023, the video had generated more than 100 million views.

Track listings

1985 edition
 7-inch
A. "Living on My Own" (single version)
B. "My Love Is Dangerous" (album version) – 3:41

 12-inch
A. "Living on My Own" (extended version) – 6:42
B. "My Love Is Dangerous" (extended version) – 6:28

1993 edition
 7-inch/cassette
A. "Living on My Own" (radio mix)
B. "Living on My Own" (1992 album remix)

 12-inch
A1. "Living on My Own" (extended mix)
A2. "Living on My Own" (club mix)
B1. "Living on My Own" (dub mix)
B2. "Living on My Own" (LA mix)

 CD single
 "Living on My Own" (radio mix)
 "Living on My Own" (extended mix)
 "Living on My Own" (club mix)
 "Living on My Own" (1992 album remix)

Personnel

 Freddie Mercury – lead and backing vocals
 Colin Peter – additional production / remix
 Carl Ward – additional production / remix
 Serge Ramaekers – additional production / remix

Charts

Weekly charts

Year-end charts

Decade-end charts

Sales and certifications

See also
 List of posthumous number ones on the UK Singles Chart

References

External links
  (from Greatest Hits III)

1985 songs
1985 singles
1993 singles
EMI Records singles
European Hot 100 Singles number-one singles
Freddie Mercury songs
Hollywood Records singles
Number-one singles in Denmark
Number-one singles in Greece
Number-one singles in Iceland
Number-one singles in Israel
Number-one singles in Italy
Number-one singles in Norway
Number-one singles in Spain
Number-one singles in Sweden
Parlophone singles
SNEP Top Singles number-one singles
Songs about loneliness
Song recordings produced by Reinhold Mack
Songs written by Freddie Mercury
UK Singles Chart number-one singles